Kaira or KAIRA may refer to:

Places
 Kaira (Lydia), a town of ancient Lydia, now in Turkey

In India
 Kheda, also known as Kaira, a town in Gujarat, India
 Kaira district
 Kaira Agency, a former administrative unit
 Kaira (Lok Sabha constituency)

People with the name 
 Mulaza Kaira (born 1984), Zambian musician
 Qamar Zaman Kaira (born 1960), Pakistani politician
 Tanveer Ashraf Kaira (born 1960), Pakistani politician
 Kaira Gong (born 1981), Singaporean singer

Other uses 
The Gayiri people of central Queensland, also spelt Kaira
 Kaira (spider), a genus of spiders
 KAIRA, an astronomical observatory in Finland

See also 

 Karra (disambiguation)
 Khaira (disambiguation)
 Keira (disambiguation)
 Les Kaïra, a 2012 French film